The 1980–81 NBA season was the Nuggets 5th season in the NBA and their 14th season as a franchise.

Draft picks

The Denver Nuggets made twelve selections in the 1980 NBA Draft.

Roster

Regular season

Season standings

Notes
 z, y – division champions
 x – clinched playoff spot

Record vs. opponents

Game log

Player statistics

Awards and records

Transactions

References

Denver Nuggets seasons
De
Denver Nugget
Denver Nugget